Spring Creek is a stream in Victoria County, Texas, in the United States.

Spring Creek was named from its source at a clear spring. A 1970 newspaper article reports the stream's waters had been since muddied by industrial pollution.

See also
List of rivers of Texas

References

Rivers of Victoria County, Texas
Rivers of Texas